Bīntiě was a type of refined iron, which was known for its hardness. It was often used in the making of Chinese weapons. Bintie was an important article of income in medieval Yuan China as technological advances from the preceding Song dynasty improved Yuan smelting technology. Bintie was referred as "fine steel", due to its high carbon content.

See also
 History of ferrous metallurgy

References

 Romance of the Three Kingdoms/Chapter 1

External links
bilingual article about 鑌鐵
discussion forum about a Han Dynasty sword
Guoyu Cidian (國語辭典)

Steels
Chinese inventions
Ferrous alloys
Yuan dynasty